Lust Stories is a 2018 Indian Hindi-language anthology film, consisting of four short film segments directed by Anurag Kashyap, Zoya Akhtar, Dibakar Banerjee, and Karan Johar and based on the concept of the 2013 anthology film Bombay Talkies. Co-produced by Ronnie Screwvala of RSVP and Ashi Dua of Flying Unicorn Entertainment, the film has an ensemble cast including Radhika Apte, Bhumi Pednekar, Manisha Koirala and Kiara Advani with Akash Thosar, Vicky Kaushal, Neha Dhupia and others.

Lust Stories is the second of three anthology films from Johar, Banerjee, Akhtar and Kashyap, being preceded by Bombay Talkies in 2013 and followed by Ghost Stories in 2020, the latter also being released on Netflix. The film was nominated for two Awards at the 47th International Emmy Awards; Best TV Movie or Miniseries and Best Actress for Apte.

Plot
Anurag Kashyap

Kalindi (Radhika Apte), a college professor, engages in a one night stand with a student of hers named Tejas (Akash Thosar). The morning after, she reassures herself that it was only a one-time occurrence but later stresses over the power dynamic of a student-teacher relationship. Multiple scenes are woven throughout the segment which depict Kalindi speaking to someone off-screen, in the fashion of an interview. During these cuts, she reveals that she is married to a man named Mihir, who is 12 years older than her and remains a close confidante. Inspired by his adventurous stories of love and numerous short-term relationships, Kalindi is also on a mission to explore her own sexuality. She begins dating her colleague Neeraj (Randeep Jha) but breaks up with him due to his firm belief in monogamy and his sexual awkwardness. She realizes that Tejas is beginning a relationship with his classmate Natasha (Ridhi Khakhar), which Tejas vehemently denies. To get him to confess, Kalindi obsessively stalks the couple, behaves rudely towards Natasha, and even breaks into Tejas's room to search for evidence. Finally, in her exasperation, Kalindi relays to Tejas that she was interested in him and that she wishes him luck with Natasha. Tejas tells her that he was unaware of her feelings and is willing to leave Natasha for her, to which Kalindi replies, "Are you mad? I'm married".

Zoya Akhtar

Sudha (Bhumi Pednekar) and Ajit (Neil Bhoopalam) are secretly in a passionate sexual relationship. It is revealed that Sudha is his maid, who arrives daily to clean his bachelor apartment. Ajit's parents arrive to stay for some time, during which Sudha is shown to diligently work for the family, despite earning only ignorance from Ajit. One day, a family arrives with their daughter for a marriage proposal and Sudha is silently heartbroken. As she prepares food, she watches the two families finalize the marriage and discuss the futures of their children. Sudha serves them tea and finds Ajit romancing his bride-to-be in his room. She appears to be desolate as Ajit's mother distributes sweets and congratulates her. Sudha slowly eats a piece of the sweets and resuming her normal routine, is shown to leave the apartment after yet another day of work.

Dibakar Banerjee

Reena (Manisha Koirala), a banker, is in an extra-marital affair with her husband's close friend Sudhir (Jaideep Ahlawat). The two are in love and have maintained their secret relationship for 3 years. During one of Reena's visits to Sudhir's home, Salman (Sanjay Kapoor) relays to Sudhir that he suspects Reena is cheating on him. This causes Sudhir and Reena to panic. Reena voices they should tell Salman about the affair so they can openly be together and is disheartened at Sudhir's reaction as he does not seem to think it a possibility. Reena ends up calling Salman to Sudhir's home. Reena reveals to Salman that she is unhappy in their marriage, and feels that Salman only needs a mother for his children, not a wife. After she reveals her 3-year affair with Sudhir, Salman breaks down and asks her to stay for the sake of their children. Later that night, the couple bond and make love whilst Reena is grief-stricken. The next morning, she tells Sudhir that Salman knows about the affair, wants her to end it and that Sudhir can never "know" that Salman was aware of the affair at all. Reena tells Sudhir that she cannot meet him again and leaves with her husband.

Karan Johar

Megha (Kiara Advani) is a young school teacher who is engaged to Paras (Vicky Kaushal), an office worker. After their marriage, Megha discovers that while Paras is continuously pleasured during sex, he is not aware of her dissatisfaction. His family pushes her to bear children, as they believe this is the only pleasure that a woman desires. One day, Megha witnesses her colleague Rekha (Neha Dhupia) using a vibrator in the school library. This motivates Megha to use one too; however, when she attempts to try it out at home, Paras arrives in a disheveled state from an accident and she rushes out to the living room with her vibrator still inside her. Paras' grandmother mistakes the vibrator's remote for a TV remote and unknowingly begins to increase the intensity. Megha enjoys it with pleasure. She tries to control herself but fails. Megha eventually climaxes into an orgasm as her mother-in-law, sister-in-law, and Paras watch in shock. Enraged, Paras's mother demands a divorce and announces that Megha's womb is not suitable to bear her son's children. One month later, Paras meets Megha and tells her that he does not wish to divorce her just because she made a mistake. After she firmly says that she made no mistake and that a woman has more desires than just children, Paras romantically feeds her ice cream, indicating that he is interested in pleasing her.

Cast
Anurag Kashyap's segment
Radhika Apte as Kalindi Dasgupta
Akash Thosar as Tejas Bhave
Ridhi Khakhar as Natasha Thakral
Randeep Jha as Neeraj Choudhry
Unknown as Mihir Dasgupta
Zoya Akhtar's segment
Bhumi Pednekar as Sudha Maheshwari
Neil Bhoopalam as Ajit Khanna
Nikita Dutta as Rukmini Sonkari
Rasika Duggal as Sonalika Atiharan

Dibakar Banerjee's segment
Manisha Koirala as Reena Bahl
Jaideep Ahlawat as Sudhir
Sanjay Kapoor as Salman Ahmed Bahl

Karan Johar's segment
Kiara Advani as Megha Upadhyay
Vicky Kaushal as Paras Upadhyay
Neha Dhupia as Rekha

Production
Lust Stories is developed as a sequel to the 2013 anthology film Bombay Talkies. It has been co-produced by Ronnie Screwvala and Ashi Dua under the label of their respective production companies RSVP and Flying Unicorn Entertainment. The four segments of the anthology film have been directed by Anurag Kashyap, Zoya Akhtar and Dibakar Banerjee and Karan Johar respectively.

Release
The international distribution rights for Lust Stories were acquired by Netflix. The film was released on Netflix on 15 June 2018.

Soundtrack
The film score was composed and one song was guest-composed by Sameer Uddin, while rest of the songs were composed by Amit Trivedi, Tanishk-Vayu and Prateek Kuhad.

The lyrics were written by Shellee, Kumar Suryavanshi, Prateek Kuhad and Tanishk-Vayu.

Reception

Critics praised the film's portrayal of women and its exploration of female sexuality, a subject which has been rarely dealt with in Indian films. Film critic Alaka Sahani used the metaphor of a woman’s body is draped in a dupatta while discussing the sheltered sexuality of women in general, a theme that took a central position in the narrative; she praised the handling of the subject matter as clinical in the subversion of such regressive stereotypes associated with women who have an active sex life as the presumably amorous "vamps" in the Indian film industry. Kiara Advani's masturbation scene in the film, using a vibrator, was praised for its frank portrayal of women's sexuality.

Mridula R of The News Minute echoed the sentiment as she praised the film's novelty in the honest portrayal of women, their "liberation, thoughts, [and] decisions". Others were also appreciative of the "glorious women [who] stubbornly and strikingly hold the reins" and the "sometimes not likeable, but definitely relatable women who usually elude our screens". Commentators responded positively to subtlety in the film's use of female protagonists; they were especially impressed by the fact the all of the stories had female protagonists "without being obnoxious about it", how they were wielded "to tell stories from a uniquely different perspective"  and how it is a befitting slap on the face of India’s morality preachers as an extremely contemporary take on — not sex in India — but on the majority’s perception on how it must be represented in culture.

Sequel

Johar, Akhtar, Banerjee and Kashyap reunited for the third part of the anthology series titled Ghost Stories, which premiered on Netflix in 2020.

References

External links

2018 films
2010s Hindi-language films
Indian anthology films
Indian direct-to-video films
Films directed by Anurag Kashyap
Films directed by Dibakar Banerjee
Films directed by Karan Johar
Hindi-language Netflix original films
Films directed by Zoya Akhtar
Films with screenplays by Anurag Kashyap
2018 direct-to-video films